Planets Against Us (original titles:) is a 1962 Italian-French science fiction horror film directed by Romano Ferrara, based on a story by Massimo Rendina. It is also known by the names Planets Around Us, Hands of a Killer, The Man With the Yellow Eyes and The Monster with Green Eyes. It is notable for featuring a planned invasion by cyborgs, humanoid shaped robots, rather than the common sci-fi film plot of aliens inhabiting, taking-over or duplicating humans.

Plot
The plane carrying atomic scientist Prof. Landersen and his son Robert crashes in the Sahara desert, killing everyone on board. Robert’s body is not found.

In the United States and USSR several rocket launches fail disastrously, with an individual closely resembling Robert Landersen seen at each at exactly the same time; he then vanishes without trace. The authorities start to suspect the involvement of alien beings, and start a worldwide manhunt to find the mysterious man.

In Rome, artist Audrey Bradbury encounters the man, who behaves oddly. She is attracted to him and decides to call him Bronco. At a party (resembling a scene from a contemporary Fellini film) Bronco meets Marina Ferri, who is engaged to Prof. Borri, who is developing a paralysing gas. She is also attracted to Bronco, who wishes to meet Prof. Borri. When Bronco and Marina are stopped in her car by the police, Bronco touches an officer with his bare hand and he  dies instantly. Later, at Audrey’s home, Audrey tries to kiss Bronco. He believes she has unwittingly betrayed him to the police and touches her back, making her crumble to dust.

Meanwhile, the authorities have concluded the Earth is being attacked by beings from another planet, all with identical appearances based on that of Robert Landersen.

Bronco is drawn to Marina, and tells her he is not human. After warning her that humanity is about to make the same mistakes with atomic radiation which destroyed his own planet, he then uses his will power to make her forget what he has told her. She takes him to meet  Prof. Borri, where the police secretly X-ray him and discover he has a metallic skeleton beneath a skin-like covering. They conclude the beings are all made to resemble Robert Landersen, and they intend to invade Earth in search of a new home.

The police attempt to track down Bronco, and a policeman shoots him with a ray gun which seriously injures him. After a car chase through and around Rome involving the Italian army, the failing Bronco is targeted by a discharge from the beings’ flying saucer which departs into space, leaving him as only a pile of rags and molten metal.

Breaking the fourth wall, one of the officials urges the audience to be vigilant, explaining that other beings like Branco are lurking out there, equally monstrous and eager to take over the Earth.

Cast
 Michel Lemoine as Bronco / Robert Landersen
 Maria Pia Luzi as Marina Ferri
 Jany Clair as Audrey Bradbury
 Marco Guglielmi as Capt. Carboni
 Piero Palermini as Ufficiale italiano
 Jacopo Tecchi as Prof. Giorgio Borri
 Otello Toso as Major Michelotti
 Peter Dane as Funzianario ONU

References

External links
 
 I pianeti contro di noi at BFI

1960s science fiction films
1962 films
Italian science fiction horror films
French science fiction horror films
1960s Italian-language films
Films set in Rome
1960s Italian films
1960s French films